Amos Paul Kennedy Jr. is an American printer, book artist and papermaker best known for social and political commentary, particularly in printed posters. One critic noted that Kennedy was “...unafraid of asking uncomfortable questions about race and artistic pretension.”

Biography
From an early age, Kennedy was interested in letters and books and studied calligraphy for several years.  At the age of 40, Kennedy visited Colonial Williamsburg, a Virginia living history museum, and was mesmerized by an 18th-century print shop and book bindery demonstration. The incident so influenced that he studied printing at a community-based letterpress shop in Chicago and, within a year quit his AT&T systems analyst job, which he had held for nearly two decades, to continue printmaking studies.

Kennedy articulated his fascination with letterpress printing in one interview: “... I believe it was the capability of making multiples. Multiples of text are important to me. They allow for distribution.”

He attended the University of Wisconsin-Madison, studied under legendary book designer Walter Hamady, and earned an MFA in 1997. He later taught graphic design at the Henry Radford Hope School of Fine Arts at Indiana University.

Technique

Kennedy creates prints, posters and postcards from handset wood and metal type, oil-based inks, and eco-friendly and affordable chipboard. Many of the posters are inspired by proverbs, sayings, and quotes Kennedy locates or potential clients provide.

Using hand presses, he “produces large editions of wildly colourful, typographically-driven posters on inexpensive chipboard stock, posters which are often so riotously layered with vibrant colours of ink as to retain a wet iridescence and tackiness years after they were printed. His working method often involves overprinting multiple layers of text ...resulting in no two prints being truly identical.

Awards
In 2015, Kennedy was honored as a United States Artists Glasgow Fellow in Crafts and received a $50,000 unrestricted prize.

Collections

  Kennedy & Sons Collection, Emory University, Stuart A. Rose Manuscript, Archives, and Rare Book Library, Atlanta, GA. Collection from Kennedy & Sons, Fine Printers (African American commercial printing business), 1990-2015, 6.5 linear ft. (11 boxes) and oversized papers.
 Amos Paul Kennedy Jr. collection Printers, UC Santa Barbara Library, Special Collection, Santa Barbara, CA.  Letterpress posters, broadsides, postcards, fans, publications and clippings, 1997-2013, 50.62 linear feet.
 Amos Paul Kennedy, Jr. collection, Rare Book and Manuscript Library, University of Illinois at Urbana-Champaign, Urbana, IL. Letterpress prints including posters, business cards, broadsides, fans, and maps as well as publications and clippings, 2000-2019, 17 boxes.

Selected bibliography

References

External links
 Official Website http://www.kennedyprints.com/
 Works by or about Amos Paul Kennedy Jr. in libraries (WorldCat catalog)
 Proceed and Be Bold, Laura Zinger, director, Feature Length Documentary, 1 hour, 35 mins.
 Printing Plant, the Printery of the Americas https://theprintingplant.org/
Stuart A. Rose Manuscript, Archives, and Rare Book Library, Emory University: Kennedy & Sons collection

1950 births
Living people
People from Lafayette, Louisiana
Indiana University alumni
University of Wisconsin–Madison alumni
American printers
American printmakers
American poster artists
Book artists
Artists from Detroit
Artists from Louisiana
African-American printmakers
21st-century African-American people
20th-century African-American people